There are over 100,000 Sri Lankans in Italy. Many are permanent residents or have moved there in search of work.

History
Early sources show that Sri Lankans have had a presence in the areas of present-day Italy since the Roman times. According to historian Pliny, four people from Sri Lanka visited the court of Emperor Claudius in 50 AD. There was another delegation from Sri Lanka into Rome during the era of Emperor Julian in 375 AD. There were strong links between the two countries and Sri Lanka was known as 'Taprobane' to the Romans.

Sri Lankans started to migrate to Italy in the 1970s. Italy was attractive to the migrants due to perceived easier employment opportunities and entry, compared to other European countries. The first immigration waves during the second half of the Eighties consisted mainly of Tamils, followed by Sinhalese at the beginning of the 1990s.

In the late 1970s, Catholic women migrated to Italy to work in elderly homes. Many Sri Lankans have also illegally migrated to Italy. Admission acts also encouraged more Sri Lankans to migrate to Italy. For example, the Dini Decree in 1996 made it easier for Sri Lankan workers to bring their families to Italy. In Rome, Naples and Milan, the Sri Lankans have built up "enlarged families", where jobs are exchanged among relatives and compatriots.

Demographics
Sociologist Enrica Morlicchio estimated in 1992 that 2/3rds of the Sri Lankan population in Italy was Sinhalese and Tamils constituted 1/3rd. The major Sinhalese communities in Italy are located in Lombardia (In the districts Loreto and Lazzaretto), Milan, Lazio, Rome, Naples and Southern Italy (Particularly Palermo, Messina and Catania). Most Italian Sinhalese work as domestic workers. But they have also opened businesses such as restaurants, cleaning enterprises (e.g. Cooperativa Multietnica di Pulizie
Sud-Est), call centres, video-shops, traditional food shops and minimarkets. Sinhalese are the majority of Sri Lankan Italians in most of Italy, and Sri Lankan Tamils contribute the majority of Sri Lankan Italians in Sicily.

Community
The major community organisation representing Sri Lankans in Italy is the Sri Lanka Association Italy. Smaller community and political organisation exist in areas with a sizable Sri Lankan population such as the Sri Lanka Association Florence, Coordinamento Tamil, Centro Culturale Tamil, Sri Lanka Women's Association Napoli and Associazione dei Tamil in Italia. Several other organizations are based in cities including Naples, Bologna, Lecce, Reggio Emilia etc.

Notable Sri Lankan Italians

 Nadeesha Uyangoda – Journalist and Writer (L'unica persona nera nella stanza, 66thand2nd, 2021)
 Sepala Ekanayake – Sri Lankan hijacker of the Alitalia Boeing 747
 Hemantha Jayasena – Sri Lankan born Italian cricketer.
 Samantha de Mel – Sri Lankan born Italian former cricketer

See also
 Global Sri Lankan Forum
 Italy – Sri Lanka relations
 Sri Lankan Americans
 Sri Lankan Canadians
 Sri Lankan Australians
 Sri Lankan New Zealanders
 Sri Lankans in the United Kingdom
 Sri Lankans in France
 Sri Lankans in Norway
 Sri Lankans in Sweden
 Sri Lankans in Denmark
 Sri Lankans in Germany
 Sri Lankans in Belgium
 Sri Lankans in the Netherlands
 Sri Lankans in Spain

References

External links

Ethnic groups in Italy
Immigration to Italy
Asian diaspora in Italy
 
Sri Lankan diaspora